The Vienna Spring Festival is an annual classical music festival in Vienna.  Founded in 1992, the festival is held in April and May at the Konzerthaus and other venues in Vienna.

References

External links

Vienna Spring Festival at wien.info.
Vienna Spring Festival at vienna.net.

Music festivals established in 1992
Classical music festivals in Austria
Music festivals in Austria
Festivals in Vienna
Spring (season) events in Austria